The 2004–05 Luxembourg National Division was the 91st season of top level association football in Luxembourg. The competition ran from 7 August 2004 to 29 May 2005 with F91 Dudelange winning the title.

Teams

The 2004–05 season saw the National Division's roster of twelve clubs include:
CS Alliance 01 (promoted from the Division of Honour)
FC Avenir Beggen
F91 Dudelange
FC Etzella Ettelbruck
CS Grevenmacher
Jeunesse Esch (the reigning champions)
CS Pétange (promoted from the Division of Honour)
CA Spora Luxembourg
FC Swift Hesperange
Union Luxembourg
FC Victoria Rosport
FC Wiltz 71

Format
The twelve teams completed the round-robin by playing each other twice (once home and once away) by 24 April.  Then, the league divided into three.  The top four teams were separated from the rest and formed the  'Title group' .  The bottom eight teams were then subdivided into two groups of four, titled  'Relegation group A'  and  'Relegation group B' .  In the event, the top four were F91 Dudelange, FC Etzella Ettelbruck, Jeunesse Esch, and FC Victoria Rosport.

In each of the three mini-leagues, each team played each of the three other teams in the mini-league twice (once home and once away).  To these results were added the 22 results of the first stage.  The overall points totals (and goal difference, etc.) were used to determine each club's position in its respective mini-league.

After calculating the final results after 28 games, F91 Dudelange, the top team in the title group, was declared the league champion.  The fourth-placed team in each of the relegation groups (Union Luxembourg and CA Spora Luxembourg in groups A and B respectively) was relegated to the Division of Honour.

This format is no longer used; the current season, 2006–07 uses a straightforward round-robin.

European qualification
Luxembourg was assigned one spot in the first qualifying round of the UEFA Champions League, for the league champions; it was also assigned two spots in the first qualifying round of the UEFA Cup, for the runners-up and the winners of the Luxembourg Cup.  As league champions, F91 Dudelange qualified for the Champions League.  Etzella Ettelbruck qualified for the UEFA Cup as runners-up.  CS Pétange qualified for the UEFA Cup by the Luxembourg Cup.

First phase

Table

Results

Second phase

Championship stage

Table

Results

Relegation stage

Group A

Table

Results

Group B

Table

Results

Top goalscorers

Team changes for 2005–06 season
The champions and runners-up of the Division of Honour, UN Käerjeng 97 and US Rumelange, were promoted automatically.

After the 2004–05 season ended, the two relegated clubs, Spora Luxembourg and Union Luxembourg, went ahead with the pre-arranged amalgamation with CS Alliance 01, another National Division club based in Luxembourg City.  The new club, Racing FC Union Luxembourg, took Alliance 01's place in the National Division, leaving no teams to be relegated to the Division of Honour.

References 

Luxembourg National Division seasons
Luxembourg National Division, 2004-05
1